Peter Gordon Fulton (born 1 February 1979) is a former New Zealand international cricketer who played for Canterbury at domestic level. He comes from a well recognised cricketing family with his uncle Roddy Fulton playing and captaining both Canterbury, Northern Districts, and New Zealand A from 1972 to 1985. He retired from first-class cricket in April 2017.

Domestic career
Fulton's career highlights include scoring 301 not out against Auckland at the Hagley Oval in Christchurch over 11/12 March 2003, which is the highest maiden first-class century by any New Zealand batsman. Another career highlight was when he scored 112 in an ODI against Sri Lanka in Napier, New Zealand, on 8 January 2006. In the same series he also scored two half-centuries and was NZs top-scorer.

In the final of the 2016–17 Ford Trophy, Fulton scored the fastest century in a List A cricket match in New Zealand.

International career
In March 2006, he made his Test debut against the West Indies.

In March 2013 he made his first International Test century playing against England, and scored his second Test hundred in the match's second innings. In doing so he became the fourth New Zealander to score a hundred in both innings of a Test match.

References

External links

 
 

1979 births
Living people
Canterbury cricketers
New Zealand cricketers
New Zealand One Day International cricketers
New Zealand Test cricketers
New Zealand Twenty20 International cricketers
South Island cricketers